The Dorcen G70S is a mid-size crossover vehicle (CUV) manufactured by Chinese automaker Dorcen.

Overview

Revealed in September 2018 in China, prices of the Dorcen G70S ranges from 119,900 yuan to 149,900 yuan. The power comes from a 2.0 liter Inline-4 turbo engine code named 4G63S4T provided by Shenyang-Mitsubishi. The 2.0 liter Inline-4 turbo engine is mated to s 8-speed automatic gearbox producing 177hp and 250Nm of torque.

Design
Based on the Zotye Domy X7, the design was originally previewed as the Domy X7 S, a sportier trim of the Zotye Domy X7 mid-size crossover vehicle in November 2017. The Domy X7 S features a restyled front fascia and a redesigned tailgate. As of 2018, the model was canceled and the design and platform was sold to Dorcen and renamed to Dorcen G70s.

See also
 Domy X7 the car that the Dorcen G70S was based on

References

External links

 Dorcen site

Cars of China
Dorcen G70s
Front-wheel-drive vehicles
Cars introduced in 2018
Crossover sport utility vehicles